The Alfred Drowne Road Historic District of Barrington, Rhode Island, encompasses a suburban area developed between about 1860 and 1910, a period of significant suburban growth in Barrington spurred by the connection of the town by rail to Providence in 1855.  This  residential area was before that time farmland owned by Alfred Drown, whose c. 1830 farmhouse still stands at 13 Alfred Drowne Road.  The house of his son Benjamin, built c. 1856, is at number 27.  The district includes properties along Alfred Drowne Road, as well as a few properties on Washington Street and Annawamscutt Road which are immediately adjacent.

The district was listed on the National Register of Historic Places in 2005.

See also

National Register of Historic Places listings in Bristol County, Rhode Island

References
Michael P. McKinney, Wednesday, April 20, 2005, Providence Journal "Alfred Drowne Road nears OK for National Register"

Historic districts in Bristol County, Rhode Island
Barrington, Rhode Island
Historic districts on the National Register of Historic Places in Rhode Island